Kostaq Kotta, also known as Koço Kotta (5 May 1886 – 1 September 1947), was an Albanian politician and twice prime minister during the reign of King Zog, who took a pro-Italian right-wing stance.

Biography 
He was educated in Greece and Italy. In the Principality of Albania, he served as the minister of public works and was elected to the Parliament of Albania. During the June Revolution of Fan Noli, Kotta escaped to Greece, but returned to lead the insurgency against Noli that led to the formation of the Albanian Republic under Ahmet Zogu.

He became the speaker of the parliament during Zogu’s presidency and then Prime Minister after Zogu established the  Albanian Kingdom. During his first term, he introduced civil code laws based on the Napoleonic model. 

In 1936, he headed the government again until resigning after the Italian invasion of Albania. He was a member of Mustafa Merlika-Kruja's cabinet in 1941.

He accompanied Zog into exile in Greece. In December 1944 he was captured by Greek Communists and returned to Albania. He was sentenced to lifelong imprisonment by the Albanian Communists's Special Court of Spring 1945. He died in Burrel Prison in 1947 as a result of torture.

See also
History of Albania

References 

1889 births
1949 deaths
People from Korçë
People from Manastir vilayet
Albanians from the Ottoman Empire
Mayors of Korçë
Government ministers of Albania
Prime Ministers of Albania
Public Works ministers of Albania
Albanian collaborators with Fascist Italy
Albanian people who died in prison custody
Prisoners who died in Albanian detention
Albanian prisoners sentenced to life imprisonment
Prisoners sentenced to life imprisonment by Albania
Speakers of the Parliament of Albania
Members of the Parliament of Albania
Heads of government who were later imprisoned